Homoranthus coracinus is a flowering plant in the family Myrtaceae and is endemic to a small area in Queensland. It is a low, spreading shrub with pointed, narrow, egg-shaped leaves and groups of up to six flowers with black petals. It is only known from a single population in the Ka Ka Mundi part of the Carnarvon National Park.

Description
Flowering occurs in April, May and September.

Taxonomy and naming
Homoranthus coracinus was first formally described in 2000 by Anthony Bean from a specimen collected in the Ka Ka Mundi National Park (now part of Carnarvon National Park) and the description was published in Austrobaileya. The specific epithet (coracinus) is a Latin word meaning "ravenlike" or "black as a crow", referring to the colour of the petals.

Distribution and habitat
This homoranthus grows in heath and sandstone outcrops  in shallow soils and is endemic to the Mount Mooloolong area in Carnarvon National Park in central Queensland. heath on

Conservation status
The species is known from a single population. Bean (2000) species considered endangered. ROTAP code of 2ECit using Briggs and Leigh (1996)  IUCN (2010) considered 'Endangered'.

References

Flora of Queensland
Myrtales of Australia
coracinus
Plants described in 2011